The Americas Zone was one of the three regional zones of the 1975 Davis Cup.

12 teams entered the Americas Zone split across two sub-zones, the North & Central America Zone and the South America Zone. 9 teams played in the preliminary rounds, competing to advance to the main draw and join the remaining 3 teams which advanced to the main draw directly. The winners of each sub-zone main draw then played against each other to determine who moved to the Inter-Zonal Zone to compete against the winners of the Eastern Zone and Europe Zone.

South Africa were declared winners of the North & Central America Zone by walkover after Colombia withdrew ahead of the final, while in the South America Zone Chile defeated Brazil in the final. In the Americas Inter-Zonal Final, Chile defeated South Africa and progressed to the Inter-Zonal Zone.

North & Central America Zone

Preliminary rounds

Draw

First round
Caribbean/West Indies vs. United States

Canada vs. Mexico

Qualifying round
United States vs. Mexico

Main Draw

Draw

South Africa were declared the winners of the North & Central America Zone by default after both Mexico and Colombia withdrew.

South America Zone

Preliminary rounds

Draw

Qualifying round
Uruguay vs. Argentina

Brazil vs. Bolivia

Main Draw

Draw

Semifinals
Brazil vs. Argentina

Final
Chile vs. Brazil

Americas Inter-Zonal Final
Chile vs. South Africa

Notes

References

External links
Davis Cup official website

Davis Cup Americas Zone
Americas
Davis Cup
Davis Cup
Davis Cup